Salim Touahri (born September 28, 1989) is a Polish mixed martial artist who competed in the Welterweight division of the Ultimate Fighting Championship (UFC).

Mixed martial arts career

Early career
Touahri amassed a professional mixed martial arts record of 10-1 by fighting mainly within the Polish regional MMA circuit as well as once within Russia before signing for the UFC in October 2017.

Ultimate Fighting Championship
Touahri made his UFC debut as a short-notice opponent against Warlley Alves on October 21, 2017 at UFC Fight Night: Cowboy vs. Till. He lost the fight via unanimous decision.

Touahri was expected to face Brad Scott on 27 May 2018 at UFC Fight Night: Thompson vs. Till. However, Touahri pulled out of the fight citing a knee injury.

Touahri then faced Keita Nakamura on December 1, 2018 at UFC Fight Night: dos Santos vs. Tuivasa. He lost the fight via split decision.

Touahri was expected to face Zelim Imadaev on August 3, 2019 at UFC on ESPN: Covington vs. Lawler. However, on June 9 it was announced that Touahri would face Mickey Gall instead whilst no reason for the change was provided. He lost the fight via unanimous decision.

Touahri was released by the UFC in February 2020.

Personal life
Touahri was arrested in February 2020 on charges alleging his involvement in the trade of illegal substances. He was released without bail in 2021 after the court decided that prosecution's case is based solely on testimonies of a criminal convicted earlier for lying under oath

Mixed martial arts record

|-
|Loss
|align=center|10–4
|Mickey Gall
|Decision (unanimous)
|UFC on ESPN: Covington vs. Lawler
|
|align=center|3
|align=center|5:00
|Newark, New Jersey, United States
|
|-
|Loss
|align=center|10–3
|Keita Nakamura
|Decision (split)
|UFC Fight Night: dos Santos vs. Tuivasa
|
|align=center|3
|align=center|5:00
|Adelaide, South Australia, Australia
|
|-
|Loss
|align=center|10–2
|Warlley Alves
|Decision (unanimous)
|UFC Fight Night: Cowboy vs. Till
|
|align=center|3
|align=center|5:00
|Gdańsk, Poland
|
|-
|Win
|align=center|10–1
|Bayzet Khatkhokhu
|KO (punch)
|Tech-Krep FC - Prime Selection 2016 Final
|
|align=center|1
|align=center|3:11
|Krasnodar, Russia
|
|-
|Win
|align=center|9–1
|Matt Inman
|KO (punch to the body)
|XCage 9 / PLMMA 65 - Torun
|
|align=center|1
|align=center|3:56
|Torun, Poland
|
|-
|Win
|align=center|8–1
|Tomasz Romanowski
|Decision (majority)
|XCage 7 / PLMMA 50 - Torun
|
|align=center|3
|align=center|5:00
|Torun, Poland
|
|-
|Win
|align=center|7–1
|Gabor Szabo
|TKO (punches)
|BoW (KR) - Battle of Warriors 2
|
|align=center|2
|align=center|4:56
|Krakow, Poland
|
|-
|Win
|align=center|6–1
|Bartlomiej Ambroziak
|TKO (punches)
|Soul FC 2 - The Next Battle
|
|align=center|1
|align=center|2:50
|Zielona Gora, Poland
|
|-
|Loss
|align=center|5–1
|Pawel Zelazowski
|KO (punches)
|PLMMA 22 - Black Dragon
|
|align=center|1
|align=center|0:28
|Andrychow, Poland
|
|-
|Win
|align=center|5–0
|Radoslaw Domanski
|TKO (punches)
|SMMA - Superleague of MMA 1
|
|align=center|1
|align=center|4:12
|Warsaw, Poland
|
|-
|Win
|align=center|4–0
|Zbigniew Zlobinski
|Decision (unanimous)
|MMAC 12 - The City of Kings
|
|align=center|3
|align=center|3:00
|Krakow, Poland
|
|-
|Win
|align=center|3–0
|Igor Smith
|Submission (rear-naked choke)
|BB - Bigger's Better
|
|align=center|1
|align=center|3:40
|Andrychow, Poland
|
|-
|Win
|align=center|2–0
|Daniel Tobolik
|Submission (arm-triangle choke)
|MMAA - MMA Andrychow
|
|align=center|1
|align=center|3:19
|Andrychow, Poland
|
|-
|Win
|align=center|1–0
|Rafal Kowalski
|KO (punch)
|Black Dragon - Fight Show
|
|align=center|1
|align=center|
|Andrychow, Poland
|
|-

See also 
 List of male mixed martial artists

References

External links 

 
 

1989 births
Living people
Welterweight mixed martial artists
Mixed martial artists utilizing boxing
Mixed martial artists utilizing Brazilian jiu-jitsu
Polish male mixed martial artists
Sportspeople from Kraków
Ultimate Fighting Championship male fighters
Polish practitioners of Brazilian jiu-jitsu